North Carolina Highway 113 (NC 113) is a primary state highway in the U.S. state of North Carolina.  It runs from NC 18 in the community of Laurel Springs, to NC 93 in the community of Piney Creek.

Route description

NC 113 is an exceptionally straight road in the area; the highway serves as a connector to Virginia from either NC 18 or U.S. Route 221 (US 221). Nearby New River State Park can be accessed by either via US 221 or South Fork Church Road.

History
NC 113 was established in 1930 as a primary new routing from Toluca to Newton.  In late 1934, it was renumbered to NC 73 (replaced in 1940 by the current NC 10).  NC 113 returned in 1937 as a renumbered route through Halifax when US 301 was rerouted to bypass the city.  It was renumbered, around 1960, as US 301A (today as US 301 Business).

The third, and current, NC 113 was established in 1964, which was extended further north in 1977 to its current terminus after NC 93 was also rerouted further north.

Junction list

See also

References

External links

113
Transportation in Alleghany County, North Carolina
Transportation in Ashe County, North Carolina